Rosemary's Baby is a 1967 horror novel by American writer Ira Levin; it was his second published book. It was the best-selling horror novel of the 1960s, selling over 4 million copies. The high popularity of the novel was a catalyst for a "horror boom", and horror fiction would achieve enormous commercial success.

Plot
The book centers on Rosemary Woodhouse, a young woman who has just moved into the Bramford, a historic Gothic Revival-style New York City apartment building, with her husband, Guy, a struggling actor. Guy has so far appeared only in small roles in the stage plays Luther, Nobody Loves an Albatross, and various TV commercials. The pair is warned that the Bramford has a disturbing history involving witchcraft and murder, but they discount this. Rosemary wants to start a family, but Guy prefers waiting until his career is more established.

Neighbors Minnie and Roman Castevet, an eccentric, elderly couple, welcome Rosemary and Guy to the Bramford. Rosemary finds them meddlesome and annoying, but Guy begins frequently visiting them.

After the lead actor in a new stage play suddenly goes blind, Guy is cast in the role. Immediately afterward, Guy unexpectedly agrees with Rosemary that they should have their first child. That night, Rosemary dreams of a rough sexual encounter with a huge, inhuman creature with yellow eyes. The next morning Rosemary finds claw marks on her breasts and groin, which Guy dismisses as resulting from his hangnail, which he has cut. Rosemary subsequently learns that she is pregnant.

Rosemary falls severely ill; but her intense pain and weight loss are ignored by others and attributed to hysteria. Her doctor and Minnie feed her strange and foul concoctions. Rosemary also develops a peculiar craving for raw meat.

Guy's performance in the play garners favorable notices, and other increasingly significant roles follow. Guy soon begins talking about a career in Hollywood.

Rosemary's friend, Edward "Hutch" Hutchins, also becomes mysteriously ill. He had sent Rosemary a warning, leading to her discovery that Roman Castevet is the leader of a Satanic coven. She suspects her unborn baby is wanted as a sacrifice to the devil. Despite her growing conviction, she is unable to convince anyone, particularly Guy. Ultimately, Rosemary discovers the coven's real intent for wanting her baby, whom she wanted to name Andrew ("Andy") but whom the coven insists will be renamed Adrian. He is the Antichrist, and Satan sired him, not Guy.

Critical reception
Cherry Wilder wrote that "Rosemary's Baby is one of the most perfectly crafted thrillers ever written". 

Horror scholar Gary Crawford described Rosemary's Baby as "a genuine masterpiece". 

David Pringle described Rosemary's Baby as "this sly, seductive impeccably-written horror novel ... is an expertly constructed story, a playwright's book, in which every physical detail and line of dialogue counts."

Adaptations
In 1968, the novel was adapted as a film of the same name, starring Mia Farrow, with John Cassavetes as Guy. Ruth Gordon, who played Minnie Castevet, won an Academy Award for Best Supporting Actress. Roman Polanski, who wrote and directed the film, was nominated for Best Writing, Screenplay Based on Material from Another Medium. The exterior shots of the fictional Bramford apartment were filmed at the Dakota on Central Park West in New York. 

A television film sequel to the Polanski film, Look What's Happened to Rosemary's Baby, was produced in 1976.

In 2014, the novel was adapted as an NBC television miniseries, with Zoe Saldaña as Rosemary. The two-part miniseries aired on Mother's Day of that year. Neither the remake nor the TV miniseries garnered critical acclaim.

Sequel
Thirty years later Levin published a sequel to the novel, titled Son of Rosemary (1997). Levin dedicated it to Mia Farrow.

Censorship
Rosemary's Baby was published in Spanish translation during the Francoist dictatorship. The Francoist censors cut passages from this translation, claiming the cut passages "glorified Satan". As of April 2019, all the Spanish-language editions of the book still retain these cuts.

See also

The Dunwich Horror by H. P. Lovecraft
The Great God Pan by Arthur Machen

References

External links
Photos of the first edition of Rosemary's Baby

American horror novels
American novels adapted into films
Books with cover art by Paul Bacon
Novels about the Antichrist
American novels adapted into television shows
Novels by Ira Levin
Novels set in New York City
Random House books
Satanism in popular culture
Fiction about the Devil
1967 American novels
Witchcraft in written fiction
Censored books
Novels about human pregnancy
Censorship in Spain
Religious controversies in literature